Michael Odylon "Mikee" Lagman Romero (born March 21, 1972) is a Filipino businessman, politician, and polo player who previously served as a House Deputy Speaker from 2019 to 2022, except for a 12-day period out of office in October 2020 due to a House leadership crisis. He is concurrently serving as a Party-list Representative for 1-Pacman since 2016. He is also the president of the Party-list Coalition, an alliance of more than 50 representatives from various party-lists. As a businessman, he is currently the chairman and president of Globalport 900, Inc. and owns the NorthPort Batang Pier basketball team in the Philippine Basketball Association (PBA).  As of December 2018, his declared net worth is ₱ 7.858 billion. He is the Philippines' richest Congress representative and is among the country's 50 richest persons.

Business career
Romero serves as Chairman of the Board of Globalport 900, Inc., formerly MIC Holdings Corp, since June 7, 2012. He graduated Bachelor of Arts from De La Salle University (while also played for the university's varsity basketball team) and a Masters in Business Management from the Asian Institute of Management. He also holds two doctorate degrees in Business Administration and Political Economics coming from the International Academy of Management and Economics and De La Salle University.

He is also Chief Executive Officer of Harbour Centre Port Terminal, Inc., Chairman of Manila North Harbour Port, Inc., Chairman of Mikro-tech Capital, Inc., CEO of Pacifica, Inc. He is the Chairman of 168 Ferrum Pacific Mining Corporation and Vice Chairman of AirAsia Philippines.

Son of construction magnate Reghis Romero II, Romero worked in venture capital in Singapore before returning home in 2002 to seize country's infrastructure opportunity. He converted family's reclaimed land into Harbour Center Port Terminal, now country's biggest bulk and breakbulk port. He listed his port assets in 2011, with a reverse takeover of listed MIC Holdings, renaming it GlobalPort 900, Inc. He said he wants to build a 'seaport highway' across the Philippines archipelago. He also has 65% stake in Manila North Harbour, country's biggest port, where San Miguel is a partner. Other interests include mining, hotels, a 20% stake in Air Asia Philippines and 15% in Alfred Yao's Zest Airways.

Sports
He captains country's polo team and owns a baseball team (Manila Sharks) and a PBA team (NorthPort Batang Pier).

In polo, he is known for being the founder of the Philippine National Federation of Polo Players. He is also a polo player, competing for the Philippines at the 2019 Southeast Asian Games. He will compete in the 0-2 goals event.

Sports teams
 NorthPort Batang Pier (Philippine Basketball Association, 2012–present)
 AirAsia Flying Spikers (Philippine Super Liga, 2014)
 Manila Sharks (Baseball Philippines, 2007–2012)
 AirAsia Philippine Patriots (ASEAN Basketball League, 2009–2012)
 Harbour Centre Batang Pier/Oracle Residences Titans (Philippine Basketball League, 2004–2010)

Political career
Romero was named as one of the new deputy speakers of House Speaker Alan Peter Cayetano on August 13, 2019. During a House leadership crisis which began in late September 2020, Romero supported Lord Allan Velasco's speakership bid in accordance with the term-sharing agreement between Cayetano and Velasco during the commencement of the 18th Congress. On October 2, Fredenil Castro (Capiz–2nd) challenged the representatives to resign if they cannot cooperate with Cayetano's leadership. Deputy Majority Leader Xavier Jesus Romualdo moved to have Castro replace Romero as a deputy speaker. The motion was approved without objections, removing Romero from the position.

On October 12, a majority of House members held session at the Celebrity Sports Complex in Quezon City. After they declared the speakership vacant, Romero was one of those who nominated Velasco as speaker. Velasco was declared as the new speaker after garnering 186 votes, more than the 151 needed for a majority. However, Cayetano's side questioned the legality of the session. The next day, Velasco was formally elected in an official session held at the Batasang Pambansa while Cayetano resigned. On October 14, Romero was again elected as a deputy speaker, replacing the ousted Luis Raymund Villafuerte (Camarines Sur–2nd), a Cayetano ally.

Personal life
He and his wife Sheila collect rare Philippine and Southeast Asian art.

References

External links
 at Forbes

1971 births
Living people
De La Salle University alumni
Filipino men's basketball players
21st-century Filipino businesspeople
Filipino sportsperson-politicians
Filipino polo players
Basketball players from Manila
Party-list members of the House of Representatives of the Philippines
Asian Institute of Management alumni
Competitors at the 2019 Southeast Asian Games
Southeast Asian Games competitors for the Philippines
De La Salle Green Archers basketball players